Middle East Illusions: Including Peace in the Middle East? Reflections on Justice and Nationhood is a 2003 book by Noam Chomsky. It includes a collection of essays about the Israeli–Palestinian conflict written during the past thirty years.

Essay collections
Israeli–Palestinian conflict books
2003 non-fiction books